Orifeci leads here. For Rome, Italy church, see Sant'Eligio degli Orefici

Oscar Orefici (13 July 1946 – 26 October 2014)  was an Italian sport journalist and writer.

Born in Rome, Orefici started his career in the 1970s realizing several sport programs for RAI. An expert on Formula One, in 1978 he co-directed the documentary film Speed Fever. In the early 1990s, when Fininvest bought the F1 television rights, Orefici became the official reporter for F1 races and programs. In the late years of career he worked for Sky. He also worked for several newspapers and wrote several books, including two biographies about Enzo Ferrari.

Books
 Oscar Orefici, Luca Argentieri. Storia della formula 1. Longanesi, 1987. .
 Oscar Orefici. Enzo Ferrari. L'ingegnere rampante. Editalia, 1988. .
 Oscar Orefici. Carlo Chiti - Sinfonia Ruggente. Giorgio Nada Editore, 2003. .
 Oscar Orefici: Ferrari. Romanzo di una vita. Cairo Publishing, 2007. .

References

External links 
 

Italian male journalists
Italian sports journalists
Italian male writers
1946 births
2014 deaths
Journalists from Rome
Italian documentary filmmakers
Formula One journalists and reporters